The May Bumps 2017 were a set of rowing races at Cambridge University from Wednesday 14 June 2017 to Saturday 17 June 2017. The event was run as a bumps race and was the 126th set of races in the series of May Bumps which have been held annually in mid-June in this form since 1887.

Head of the River crews
  rowed over on all four nights to retain the headship they won in 2016.

Highest 2nd VIIIs

Links to races in other years

References 

2017 in rowing
May Bumps results
2017 in English sport